Anthony Stevens (born 2 July 1971) is a former Australian rules footballer who played for the North Melbourne Kangaroos. He was named as ruck rover in the club's official 'Team of the Century'.

Stevens was a member of North Melbourne premiership sides in 1996 and 1999. In 1998, he was an All-Australian; additionally, in the same year, he represented Victoria at State of Origin football. He was a Best and Fairest winner for his club twice, in 1997 and 1999.

Stevens lost two litres of blood and had two operations after injuries caused when falling glass hit Stevens outside the Redback Brewery Hotel in North Melbourne on 11 March 2000. Stevens suffered a 20-centimetre gash from the corner of his mouth along his right cheek and down the side of his mouth.

In 2002, he was involved in a much-publicised controversy involving Wayne Carey after it was revealed that Carey had been having an extramarital affair with his wife Kelli Stevens. The condemnation from Anthony Stevens and his teammates caused Carey to resign from the North Melbourne Football Club. 

Stevens retired at the end of the 2004 season, but he and former Kangaroos teammate Glenn Archer got together to play one match for the Caulfield Grammarians Football Club. After he retired from the AFL, Stevens accepted an ambassadorship with the VCFL. He played with Benalla in the Goulburn Valley Football League for a number of years.

Wayne Carey's affair with Stevens' wife 
In March 2002, Wayne Carey had an extramarital affair with Stevens' wife, Kelli. Making the situation even messier was the fact that Carey was himself married to his long-term partner Sally McMahon. Carey and Stevens were attending a party at teammate Glenn Archer's house. Carey is quoted as saying Kelli followed him into the toilets in front of a large crowd, including her husband. An argument ensued between Carey and Stevens, and both players subsequently failed to attend football training. In the face of his team being united against him, as well as nationwide condemnation, Carey resigned in disgrace from North Melbourne. Carey's then manager Ricky Nixon famously stated that his client was on "suicide watch" during the aftermath. To avoid media attention, Carey fled to Las Vegas, USA. Stevens had played groomsman to Carey at his wedding to Sally.

North Melbourne champion and AFL Hall of Famer Brent Harvey said it set the club back "four or five years". The aftermath of the affair resulted in Carey missing the 2002 AFL season and transferring to the Adelaide Crows for the 2003 AFL season. In a twist of fate, Stevens took over Carey's role of captain in 2004. The first game played between North Melbourne and Adelaide in 2003 made for gripping viewing, with Archer and Stevens both taunting and making aggressive moves towards Carey. Although tension was at fever pitch, all players involved managed to restrain themselves from doing anything rash. Adelaide went on to win convincingly by 54 points.

In August 2022, 20 years after the initial fallout from the affair, Carey and Stevens met again at a function to celebrate the 26th anniversary of their 1996 premiership (which was initially supposed to be a 25th anniversary but was delayed by a year due to COVID-19); Carey engaged Stevens in a "verbal stoush" at the function, although the situation was reportedly de-escalated. The Herald Sun reported there was no potential of violence and that the pair “moved on and shared a beer together” afterwards.

Despite both players' marriages being rocked by the public scandal, it took each marriage several years to dissolve. Kelli and Anthony Stevens divorced in 2008, six years after the affair, while Carey's marriage ended in 2006.

Carey labelled his affair with Stevens “the biggest regret of my life as an adult” while participating on season three of the reality TV show SAS Australia.

Statistics

|-
|- style="background-color: #EAEAEA"
! scope="row" style="text-align:center" | 1989
|style="text-align:center;"|
| 58 || 4 || 0 || 3 || 41 || 20 || 61 || 8 || 11 || 0.0 || 0.8 || 10.3 || 5.0 || 15.3 || 2.0 || 2.8
|-
! scope="row" style="text-align:center" | 1990
|style="text-align:center;"|
| 46 || 13 || 4 || 6 || 149 || 51 || 200 || 30 || 31 || 0.3 || 0.5 || 11.5 || 3.9 || 15.4 || 2.3 || 2.4
|- style="background-color: #EAEAEA"
! scope="row" style="text-align:center" | 1991
|style="text-align:center;"|
| 10 || 12 || 2 || 2 || 135 || 58 || 193 || 19 || 11 || 0.2 || 0.2 || 11.3 || 4.8 || 16.1 || 1.6 || 0.9
|-
! scope="row" style="text-align:center" | 1992
|style="text-align:center;"|
| 10 || 13 || 11 || 10 || 149 || 71 || 220 || 26 || 39 || 0.8 || 0.8 || 11.5 || 5.5 || 16.9 || 2.0 || 3.0
|- style="background-color: #EAEAEA"
! scope="row" style="text-align:center" | 1993
|style="text-align:center;"|
| 10 || 21 || 9 || 11 || 330 || 118 || 448 || 36 || 66 || 0.4 || 0.5 || 15.7 || 5.6 || 21.3 || 1.7 || 3.1
|-
! scope="row" style="text-align:center" | 1994
|style="text-align:center;"|
| 10 || 24 || 8 || 11 || 341 || 191 || 532 || 64 || 57 || 0.3 || 0.5 || 14.2 || 8.0 || 22.2 || 2.7 || 2.4
|- style="background-color: #EAEAEA"
! scope="row" style="text-align:center" | 1995
|style="text-align:center;"|
| 10 || 20 || 14 || 8 || 304 || 137 || 441 || 65 || 49 || 0.7 || 0.4 || 15.2 || 6.9 || 22.1 || 3.3 || 2.5
|-
! scope="row" style="text-align:center" | 1996
|style="text-align:center;"|
| 10 || 24 || 19 || 15 || 385 || 156 || 541 || 86 || 59 || 0.8 || 0.6 || 16.0 || 6.5 || 22.5 || 3.6 || 2.5
|- style="background-color: #EAEAEA"
! scope="row" style="text-align:center" | 1997
|style="text-align:center;"|
| 10 || 25 || 10 || 7 || 453 || 129 || 582 || 94 || 66 || 0.4 || 0.3 || 18.1 || 5.2 || 23.3 || 3.8 || 2.6
|-
! scope="row" style="text-align:center" | 1998
|style="text-align:center;"|
| 10 || 25 || 8 || 6 || 442 || 101 || 543 || 90 || 74 || 0.3 || 0.2 || 17.7 || 4.0 || 21.7 || 3.6 || 3.0
|- style="background-color: #EAEAEA"
! scope="row" style="text-align:center" | 1999
|style="text-align:center;"|
| 10 || 25 || 12 || 7 || 429 || 117 || 546 || 98 || 72 || 0.5 || 0.3 || 17.2 || 4.7 || 21.8 || 3.9 || 2.9
|-
! scope="row" style="text-align:center" | 2000
|style="text-align:center;"|
| 10 || 12 || 4 || 4 || 145 || 63 || 208 || 50 || 32 || 0.3 || 0.3 || 12.1 || 5.3 || 17.3 || 4.2 || 2.7
|- style="background-color: #EAEAEA"
! scope="row" style="text-align:center" | 2001
|style="text-align:center;"|
| 10 || 15 || 1 || 5 || 238 || 104 || 342 || 68 || 71 || 0.1 || 0.3 || 15.9 || 6.9 || 22.8 || 4.5 || 4.7
|-
! scope="row" style="text-align:center" | 2002
|style="text-align:center;"|
| 10 || 19 || 10 || 6 || 276 || 99 || 375 || 85 || 65 || 0.5 || 0.3 || 14.5 || 5.2 || 19.7 || 4.5 || 3.4
|- style="background-color: #EAEAEA"
! scope="row" style="text-align:center" | 2003
|style="text-align:center;"|
| 10 || 20 || 10 || 8 || 275 || 155 || 430 || 92 || 63 || 0.5 || 0.4 || 13.8 || 7.8 || 21.5 || 4.6 || 3.2
|-
! scope="row" style="text-align:center" | 2004
|style="text-align:center;"|
| 10 || 20 || 5 || 3 || 262 || 109 || 371 || 86 || 52 || 0.3 || 0.2 || 13.1 || 5.5 || 18.6 || 4.3 || 2.6
|- class="sortbottom"
! colspan=3| Career
! 292
! 127
! 112
! 4354
! 1679
! 6033
! 997
! 818
! 0.4
! 0.4
! 14.9
! 5.8
! 20.7
! 3.4
! 2.8
|}

References

External links

1971 births
Living people
North Melbourne Football Club players
North Melbourne Football Club Premiership players
Syd Barker Medal winners
Australian rules footballers from Victoria (Australia)
Victorian State of Origin players
All-Australians (AFL)
Shepparton Football Club players
Australian Football Hall of Fame inductees
Australia international rules football team players
Two-time VFL/AFL Premiership players